Manuel "Chino" Calderón Maraví (born January 28, 1990 in Lima) is a Peruvian footballer who  plays as a center back for Deportivo Llacuabamba in the Liga 1.

Club career
Calderón made his senior debut in the Torneo Descentralizado on March 9, 2008 in the Universitario - Sporting Cristal derby in the 6th round of the 2008 apertura. He entered the match in the 75th minute, replacing center back Jorge Araujo. The derby finished 1-0 in favor of Universitario.

International career
Calderón played for Peru at the 2007 FIFA U-17 World Cup in the Republic of Korea.

Titles

References

External links

1990 births
Living people
Footballers from Lima
Association football central defenders
Peruvian footballers
Peruvian Primera División players
Club Universitario de Deportes footballers
Juan Aurich footballers
Sport Boys footballers
José Gálvez FBC footballers
Ayacucho FC footballers
Deportivo Garcilaso players